Maria Fiore (1 October 1935 – 28 October 2004) was an Italian film and television actress. She appeared in 50 films between 1952 and 1999.

Life and career
Born Jolanda Di Fiore in Rome, in spite of a non-professional acting background, she made her film debut in a leading role, in the Renato Castellani's pink-neorealist film Two Cents Worth of Hope. Following the success of the film she was  one of the most requested actresses until the first half of the 1960s, even if often cast in stock roles of impulsive and genuine low-class girls. Starting from the 1970s she focused on television, where she got several main roles in some series.

Selected filmography

 Two Cents Worth of Hope (1952)
 Beauties on Motor Scooters (1952)
 Melody of Love (1952)
 Half a Century of Song (1952)
 Good Folk's Sunday (1953)
 Graziella (1954)
 Neapolitan Carousel (1954)
 Love Song (1954)
 A Slice of Life (1954)
 I pappagalli (1955)
 Sunset in Naples (1955)
 The Prince with the Red Mask (1955)
 Serenata a Maria (1957)
 Quanto sei bella Roma (1959)
La garçonnière (1960)
Thor and the Amazon Women (1963)
Let's Talk About Women (1964)
Il Gaucho (1964)
The Big Family (1973)
 Prostituzione (1974)
 Syndicate Sadists (1975)
 Mamma Ebe (1985)

References

External links

1935 births
2004 deaths
Italian film actresses
Italian television actresses
Deaths from lung cancer in Lazio
Actresses from Rome
20th-century Italian actresses
People of Lazian descent